Henrieta Nagyová (born 15 December 1978) is a former tennis player from Slovakia.

She turned professional in 1994 and has been ranked as high as No. 21 in the world (17 September 2001). She won nine singles tournaments and four doubles tournaments WTA Tour. Nagyová was a member of the Slovak team that won the 2002 Fed Cup.

WTA career finals

Singles: 14 (9 titles, 5 runner-ups)

Doubles: 10 (4 titles, 6 runner-ups)

ITF finals

Singles: 12 (9–3)

Doubles: 7 (5–2)

External links
 
 
 
 
 
 

1978 births
Hopman Cup competitors
Living people
People from Nové Zámky
Sportspeople from the Nitra Region
Slovak female tennis players
Olympic tennis players of Slovakia
Tennis players at the 2000 Summer Olympics
Hungarians in Slovakia
Slovak people of Hungarian descent
Grand Slam (tennis) champions in girls' doubles
French Open junior champions